The Holt Collier National Wildlife Refuge is one of seven refuges in the Theodore Roosevelt National Wildlife Refuge Complex and is a  National Wildlife Refuge located on Bogue Phalia near Darlove, Mississippi. The Refuge was named after Holt Collier (1846–1936), a Confederate veteran, cowboy, and tracker; and was created in order to provide a habitat and resources for over 250 songbirds. Moreover, approximately  has been set aside for reforestation.

History
Holt Collier National Wildlife Refuge is the only refuge to be named in honor of an African American.

Before 2004 the Farmers Home Administration managed the lands for the purpose of conservation until they were transferred to the U.S. Fish & Wildlife Service.

References

National Wildlife Refuges in Mississippi
Protected areas of Washington County, Mississippi
Protected areas established in 2004
2004 establishments in Mississippi